Dil Dosti Etc. is a 2007 Indian coming-of-age film starring Shreyas Talpade, Imaad Shah, Nikita Anand, Smriti Mishra, Ishita Sharma and Dinesh Kumar. It is directed by Manish Tiwary and produced by Prakash Jha.

Synopsis 
Apurv, a rich, aimless and cynical 18-year-old young man, who has just entered college in Delhi. Juxtaposed against the aimlessness of Apurv is also the story of Sanjay Mishra, an ambitious Bihari student & politician with limited means. They represent two divergent world views—the liberal versus the conservative, the no-strings attached versus the committed, the elite versus the middle-class. Directionless and laidback, Apurv searches for meaning in life through amorous escapades with different girls, including a sex-worker Vaishali and a school girl Kintu. Meanwhile, Sanjay works single-mindedly to win the college Presidential elections, and yet catches the attention of a rich model Prerna. Dil Dosti Etc. is woven together with an ensemble of other characters, who have their own stories to tell. Set against all these is a silly wager that the two protagonists engage in. Sanjay will win the elections and Apurv will manage to have sex with three women in a day. As the film moves towards a volatile climax, you get to test the film's premise, when you're young, you believe the possibilities are endless.

Cast 
 Imaad Shah as Apurv
 Nikita Anand as Prerna
 Smriti Mishra as Vaishali
 Ishita Sharma as Kintu
 Shreyas Talpade as Sanjay Mishra
 Dinesh Kumar as Sonu
 Soni Razdan as Apurv's mother 
 Feroze Gujral as herself

Reception
Martin D'Souza of Glamsham.com noted that, Minor flaws apart, college students are going to identify with this flick and I suspect there will be mass bookings in the days to come. Nikhat Kazmi of Times of India rated the movie 2 out of 5 stars and opined that, "The film's too slow and the scene's are too repetitive and you do get the feeling things aren't really going anywhere. But wait patiently, and the mood will catch up". Shubhra Gupta of The Indian Express wrote ″Jha has some of the characters down pat, particularly the Bihari sidekick of Sanjay; even, to an extent, Sanjay himself. That's because Shreyas is an earnest trier. But the director gets lost with Apoorva: maybe there are some young men who walk into college and hostel desperate to notch up numbers on their belts, but Shah is trying to be so cool and so laidback, that he doesn't really register. Neither does the film.″ Ruchi Naresh of Rediff.com called it a ″Brainless college flick.″

Soundtrack

References

External links
 

2007 films
2000s Hindi-language films
Indian sex comedy films
Indian teen films